Sahith Reddy Theegala (born December 4, 1997) is an American professional golfer.

Early life
Theegala was born in 1997 in Fullerton, California to Muralidhar and Karuna Theegala and has a younger brother.

Amateur career
Theegala was a three-time NCAA All-American at Pepperdine University. In his final year at Pepperdine, Theegala won the Southwestern Invitational, the Alister MacKenzie Invitational, and the Australian Master of the Amateurs. His collegiate career was cut short by the COVID-19 pandemic, which forced the 2020 season to end early, with his Pepperdine team ranked first in the nation.

In 2020, Theegala won the Haskins Award, the Ben Hogan Award, and the Jack Nicklaus Award, becoming just the fifth person ever to win all three awards in the same year.

Professional career
Theegala made his professional debut in June 2020 at the Outlaw Tour's Lone Tree Classic, where he tied for third place. He finished T-14 at the 2020 Safeway Open on the PGA Tour. He finished T-19 at his first Korn Ferry Tour event, the 2021 Chitimacha Louisiana Open. He finished T-9 at MGM Resorts Championship at Paiute. 

Theegala also played a few PGA Tour events in 2020-21, mainly on sponsors' exemptions. He received enough points as a non-member to earn a place in the Korn Ferry Tour Finals in 2021. He then finished T-4 at Nationwide Children's Hospital Championship and 6th at Korn Ferry Tour Championship. With consecutive top-10 finishes in the Korn Ferry Tour Finals, Theegala secured his PGA Tour card for 2021–22 season. He got his first top-10 finish on the PGA Tour at the Sanderson Farms Championship in October 2021. He finished third at the WM Phoenix Open in February 2022. He finished seventh at the Valspar Championship in March 2022. In June 2022, Theegala tied for second in the Travelers Championship.  At the end of the 2021–22 season, Theegala made the Tour Championship by finishing in top 30. 

Theegala opened his 2022–23 season with a top-10 finish at the Fortinet Championship in September 2022. He tied for second at the RSM Classic in November 2022, two shots behind winner Adam Svensson. He continued his season with a tied-for-sixth finish at the Genesis Invitational in February 2023.

Personal life
Theegala appeared in the sports documentary series Full Swing, which premiered on Netflix on February 15, 2023.

Amateur wins
2010 Future Masters 1
2011 Junior All-Star at Robinson Ranch
2012 Presidents Boys Cup
2014 Los Angeles City Championship
2017 Southwestern Invitational, Sahalee Players Championship
2018 Waves Challenge
2019 SCGA Amateur Championship, Alister MacKenzie Invitational
2020 Australian Master of the Amateurs, Southwestern Invitational

Source:

Professional wins (1)

Other wins (1)

Results in major championships
Results not in chronological order in 2020.

CUT = missed the halfway cut
NT = No tournament due to COVID-19 pandemic

Results in The Players Championship

CUT = missed the halfway cut

U.S. national team appearances
Amateur
Arnold Palmer Cup: 2018 (winners)

Source:

See also
2021 Korn Ferry Tour Finals graduates

References

External links
 
 

American male golfers
Pepperdine Waves men's golfers
Golfers from California
Sportspeople from Orange, California
American people of Telugu descent
1997 births
Living people